Big Bras d'Or is an unincorporated place in the Municipality of the County of Victoria, Nova Scotia, Canada. An early shipbuilding site, the 1848 Inconstant is now an historical site in New Zealand. Fishing is a source of income.

Communities in Victoria County, Nova Scotia
General Service Areas in Nova Scotia